Together Alone is the ninth studio album by American rock singer Donnie Iris, released in 1999.

Track listing
"Amazing Grace" (John Newton)
"The Promise" (Hoenes)
"Lay with Me" (Avsec)
"Together Alone" (Avsec)
"You're Holding My Heart in Your Hands" (Avsec)
"Fade Away" (Avsec)
"Ah! Leah!" (acoustic version) (Avsec, Iris)
"I'd Rather Go Blind" (Avsec)
"Holy Love" (Avsec)
"Amazing Grace" (extended version) (Newton)

Personnel

Donnie Iris and the Cruisers
Donnie Iris - vocals
Mark Avsec - organ, accordion, synths, piano, vocals
Marty Lee Hoenes - guitar and vocals
Paul Goll - bass guitar and vocals
Tommy Rich - drums

Guest performers
 Kelsey Barber (of Brownie Mary)
 Scott Blasey (of the Clarks)
 Jim DeSpirito (of Rusted Root)
 Joe Grushecky
 Michael Stanley
 B. E. Taylor
 Rick Witkowski (of B. E. Taylor)

Production
Mark Avsec - Producer
Greg Zydyk - Engineer, Mixing
Marty Lee Hoenes - Design

References

Donnie Iris albums
1999 albums
Albums produced by Mark Avsec